The Siba culture, also called Huoshaogou culture, was a Bronze Age archaeological culture that flourished circa 1900 to 1500 BC in the Hexi Corridor, in Gansu Province of Northwest China. It was discovered in 1984 at Sibatan in Shandan County. Siba type pottery vessels are different from the others in Gansu. Siba produced painted pottery with coloured decorations; these were painted after the vessels had been fired. Similar pottery was used by the Tianshanbeilu culture at Hami basin to the west.

The Siba engaged in agricultural activities like millet farming and pig farming. Their metallurgy was highly developed.

Siba culture is found mainly to the west of the Gansu corridor. The locations are found at Yongchang, Minyue, Jiuquan, Yumen counties, and others. Siba culture is bordered by the Qijia culture to the east. The later period of Qijia is very close to Siba culture. The Siba culture may have developed independently.

The site of Ganguya in Jiuquan has been excavated.

Significant differences have been observed in the comparison of the burial customs and artifacts in the three sites excavated: Donghuishan, Huoshaogou and Ganguya.

"During the first two periods of the [Donghuishan] Cemetery, there were only arsenical copper articles, but by the third period, bronze articles came into being. In the Ganguya Cemetery which was later than the Donghuishan Cemetery, more than sixty-five percent of the copper samples was tested bronze articles."

Siba culture played an intermediary role between the cultures to the east and west. There were also contacts with the Eurasian steppe. Research indicates that there was close interaction between agricultural and pastoral/hunting communities in this wide geographical area; pastoral/hunting communities also possessed many metal artefacts.

References

Further reading 
 Jidong Yang, Siba: Bronze Age Culture of the Gansu Corridor. (PDF) Sino-Platonic Papers, 86 (October 1998)
 A Study on Donghuishan Cemetery— Including a Discussion on the Siba Culture and its Position in  Sino-Western Cultural Exchange (A Summary) Zhang Zhongpei

Archaeological cultures of China
Bronze Age in China
History of Gansu
1984 archaeological discoveries